Arnold Maria Walter, OC (August 30, 1902 – October 6, 1973) was a Canadian musicologist, educator, composer and writer. He founded the Canadian Opera Company, and was Director of Music at University of Toronto.

Early years
Arnold Maria Walter was born in Hanušovice, Moravia, Austria-Hungary (now in the Czech Republic). He studied law at the University of Prague, then musicology at the University of Berlin. In addition, he had private music lessons in piano and composition with Rudolf Breithaupt, Frederic Lamond, and Franz Schreker.

Career
In the early 1930s, Walter wrote the music column for Die Weltbühne, and was music critic for the Vorwärts magazine. In 1937, he emigrated to Canada and taught at Upper Canada College.

From 1952 to 1968, Walter was music director of the music faculty of the University of Toronto. Among his notable pupils were pianist Howard Brown, Phil Nimmons.

He received an Honorary Doctor of Music from Mount Allison University in 1966. In 1972, Walter was appointed Officer of the Order of Canada.

He died in Toronto, Ontario, Canada. His records were donated to the National Library of Canada by his stepdaughter.

Works
 Sonatina for Cello and Piano, 1940
 Trio for Violin, Cello and Piano, 1940 
 Sonata for Violin and Piano, 1940 
 Symphony in G minor for large orchestra, 1942
 Suite for Piano, 1945
 For the Fallen for soprano, mixed chorus and orchestra, 1949
 Concerto for Orchestra, 1958
 Sonata for Piano Forte, 1950
 Summer Idyll for tape, 1960

References

External links
Arnold Maria Walter archival papers held at the University of Toronto Archives and Records Management Services

1902 births
1973 deaths
People from Šumperk District
Moravian-German people
Canadian male composers
Officers of the Order of Canada
Academic staff of the University of Toronto
20th-century Canadian composers
20th-century Canadian male musicians
Canadian musicologists
20th-century musicologists